Lin Shen may refer to:

Lin Shen (actor) (born 1980), a Chinese actor
Lin Shen (politician) (1908–1992), a Taiwanese politician
Lin Sen (1868–1943), Chinese politician